Mennen Tullen is a four-part parody mini-series created by Studio Julmahuvi. It aired on YLE between 2000 and -01. Though created in a form of a serious murder-mystery it is in fact a dark comedy with occasional absurd elements, technology and conventions (including a Deus Ex Machina).

The cast of characters are from Julmahuvi's various fictional cop-series and there are also other references to Julmahuvi's previous productions.

The name
The name is a simultaneous pun on the Mennen brand of colognes (which plays a part in the story) and a Finnish saying equal in context to "easy come, easy go".

Setting
The series is set in a type of hyper reality where the events of television-series constantly clash with real-life. There appear to be no exact rules or borders as some shows are clearly staged while others take place in real life. Characters on television sometimes reflect as shining figures and while being broadcast are also surrounded by a glowing white aura. The reason as to why the real events of each show are taped and stored at the broadcasting center is never revealed and most characters appear oblivious to the fact. The character of Mats also breaks the fourth wall by consciously narrating the events of the story. Also, characters from the 70s period also appear in black and white whereas other characters like Mats and Rauski have somehow made the transition to colour.

Characters

Mats
One of the two stars of Z-Salamapartio (Z-Lightning Squad), a cop-show taking place in the 1970s (though jokingly filmed in a 60s black and white to emphasize the slow development of technology in Finland) and the main protagonist and narrator of the story. Mats is the patriotic and peppy half of the team who refuses to go along with any new fads. During his last case with Rauski, the latter shot him in the leg and he quit the team. 26 years later Rauski is found dead with a strange odor about him that unlocks Mats's suppressed memories. He then begins to solve a series of murders where the victims are all people who starred in cops-shows similar to Z-Salamapartio

Raoul "Rauski" Häkkinen
Mats's partner, the cool-guy who loves to read the men's magazine Urkki and has a flair for cheap colognes. During their last case Rauski shot Mats in the leg which effectively ended their partnership. He also had an ongoing relationship with their French-speaking secretary Emmanuelle, who mysteriously lost her hearing. Mennen Tullen starts with Rauski being found dead at a subway station, the first in a series of subway related murders of cop-show stars. It is revealed that after their last case together Rauski attempted to keep the show afloat without Mats. The show gained the subtitle "Rauskin Enkelit" (Rauski's Angels) a parody of Charlie's Angels, introducing two unnamed female protagonists. Unfortunately each episode consisted only of Rauski's drunken ramblings and thus it can be assumed that his show was quickly cancelled.

Berner
One of the stars of Die Kühe (= the cows) a parody of German cop shows from the 80s. Berner is the younger of the two officers and one of the protagonists of Mennen Tullen. Berner decides to help Mats solve the murder mystery when his partner Dieter is kidnapped during his retirement party. It is revealed during Mennen Tullen that Berner and Dieter were dancers in the 70s (during Mats' and Rauski's last case) at an underground disco, which may explain the origins of Dieter's bad cough. Berner also appears to have some slight homosexual preferences. He also has a tendency to utter nonsensical one-liners (at the beginning of a chase scene he says Eine Kleine Nachtmusik), like Dieter he constantly speaks German yet others are able to understand him without difficulty and even talk back with their own mother tongue (Finnish or English).

Dieter
Berner's superior and partner on Die Kühe, an elderly looking officer with a progressively worsening caugh and an antipathy towards Turkish immigrants (which Berner shares to a degree). Dieter is kidnapped during his retirement party which prompts Berner to help Mats solve Rauski's murder-mystery. It is also revealed that Dieter and Berner were dancers prior to becoming TV-cops, while scantily glad at an underground disco, which may explain the origins of Dieter's caugh.

James
A psychic cop from the 90s style cop-show Pimeyden Tyyny (The Pillow of Darkness) commercials of which ran on Studio Julmahuvi though no full episodes were ever made. His constant companion is the anthropomorphic [The] Shark Man. After the cancellation of their show James and The Shark Man have become musicians performing at clubs. James only speaks English yet everyone is able to understand him, James also always understands the person talking back at him, despite the language of the speaker.

City Gnomes
City Gnomes are a suppressed minority, with elf-caps and long beards, whose lifestyle is threatened by the constantly increasing digging in the city's landscape. The gnomes are beginning to take direct action by invading underground bunkers and organizing protests. The gnomes bare a fading similarity to radical groups as an intentional parody.

Kalervo Friman
The TV executive with an anti-subway agenda who kidnapped Emmanuelle and set a trap for Raoul and Mats in order to cause an accident and shut down the building of the subway. Friman originally made a pilot that was rejected in favour of Z-Salamapartio.

Minor characters
Emmanuelle, Mats and Rauski's French-speaking secretary. In the 70s Rauski and Emmanuelle had a relationship which Mats disapproved of. She lost her hearing mysteriously and is now a nurse at a retirement home for characters of canceled TV-shows.
The Subway Guardsmen, the stars of their own cop-show who become additions to the collection of victims in the story.
The Indians, loosely based on the characters of Abu and Pamir from a skit in Studio Julmahuvi, a parody educational program named "Practical English, Abu". They too are killed in the process of the story.
The Eskimos based on the skit Pää kylmänä, Nanook (Kept et Køel, Eskimo) (= Keep it cool, Nanook) where the eskimos speak an unintelligible language. They apparently also had a cop-show.
Vaari ja Marsu (Granpa & the Guinea pig): An elderly man and his Guinea pig who are the stars of the cop-show which replaces The Subway Guardsmen's show after their death. Grandpa refers to the Guinea pig as Buddy, but all the other characters (including James, who only speaks English in the series) refer to the character as Marsu (the Finnish name for Guinea pig).

The Ending and the Deus Ex Machina
The story concludes in a bizarre manner when Mats' repressed memories of his and Rauski's last case come to him. He realizes that he is the cause of the events which have taken place. At end of their last case he forced Emmanuelle's kidnapper, Kalervo Friman (a TV-executive with an anti-subway agenda ), to drink an entire one liter bottle of Mennen-brand cologne while Mats himself was hallucinating from the fumes. Rauski, trying to stop him, shot Mats in the leg. Friman became disfigured and his vocal-chords were also burned by the Mennen. After his disfigurement he only received supporting parts on the cop shows and began a murder spree in order to get his revenge.

Friman had planted a bomb to stop the building of a subway network. Emmanuelle was too close to the bomb when it exploded and lost her hearing due to the explosion. After she manages to say "Mennen Tullen" (which the inebriated Mats kept repeating as he doused Friman), Mats comes to the realization that for years he had believed that his hallucinations were how the events actually turned out: a happy get-together at the Z-Salamapartio headquarters with champagne and a job-offer for the disgruntled Friman.

Mats then sneaks in to the broadcasting center and rewinds the Master Tape of the incident to the point in time before he opened the bottle and somehow takes over his own body and prevents the horrific chain of events from taking place.

Finnish comedy television series